Declan Lynch (born 1961) is an Irish journalist, writer and playwright. Lynch was born in Athlone, Ireland, and now works for the Sunday Independent.

Lynch graduated from Marist College secondary school in 1978. He dropped out of law school after one year and began writing for the music magazine Hot Press. He did this for a number of years before leaving to work for the Independent.

Works

Books
 Ireland on Three Million Pounds a Day (May 1999) 
 Do Nothing Till You Hear from Me (January 2003)
 All The People, All The Time (April 2004)
 The Rooms (January 2005)
 Free Money (April 2009) 
 The Book of Poor Ould Fellas (with Arthur Matthews) (2009)
 Days of Heaven – Italia 90 and the Charlton Years (2010)
 A Football Man – John Giles with Declan Lynch (2010)
 Tony 10: The Astonishing Story of the Postman who Gambled €10,000,000 ... and Lost it All – Tony O'Reilly with Declan Lynch (2018)

Plays
 Massive Damages (1997)

Notes

External links
 

1961 births
Living people
Hot Press people
Irish dramatists and playwrights
Irish male dramatists and playwrights
Irish novelists
People from Athlone
Sunday Independent (Ireland) people
Irish male novelists